The East Blackstone Friends Meetinghouse (also known as "Mendon Lower Meeting" or "Smithfield Monthly Meeting") is a historic Quaker meetinghouse in Blackstone, Massachusetts.  The small single-story wood-frame structure was built in 1812 on land donated to the Quakers by Samuel Smith, a local landowner.  The building was used regularly throughout the 19th century for meetings, and sporadically since then.

The meeting house was listed on the National Register of Historic Places in 1995.

See also
National Register of Historic Places listings in Worcester County, Massachusetts

References

See also
Meetinghouse web site

Quaker meeting houses in Massachusetts
Churches completed in 1812
Churches on the National Register of Historic Places in Massachusetts
Churches in Worcester County, Massachusetts
National Register of Historic Places in Worcester County, Massachusetts
Buildings and structures in Blackstone, Massachusetts